Cacuciu may refer to several places in Romania:

 Căcuciu, a village in Beica de Jos Commune, Mureș County
 Cacuciu Nou, a village in Măgești Commune, Bihor County
 Cacuciu Vechi, a village in Aușeu Commune, Bihor County